The 2016 American Cup, known as the 2016 AT&T American Cup for sponsorship reasons, was the fortieth edition of the American Cup, part of the World Cup circuit in artistic gymnastics. It was held on March 5, 2016, at the Prudential Center in Newark. Gabrielle Douglas of the United States won the women's competition, and Ryohei Kato of Japan won the men's.

USA Gymnastics promoted the event as the beginning of preparations for the 2016 Olympic Games. For the seventh year, the competition was held in conjunction with the Nastia Liukin Cup. For the first time, it was also held in conjunction with the Elite Team Cup, a men's competition.

It was the first time that USA Gymnastics held a national artistic gymnastics competition in New Jersey. Two days beforehand, on March 3, 2016, it was announced that the 2017 AT&T American Cup would also be held at the Prudential Center.

Background 
On March 4, 2015, USA Gymnastics announced that the 2016 AT&T American Cup had been awarded to the Prudential Center. The president of USA Gymnastics, Steve Penny, called the Prudential Center "one of our most successful stops on the 2012 Kellogg's Tour of Superstars", later adding, "The New York metropolitan area has a strong gymnastics community, and we look forward to again kicking off the Olympic year in the area." Although New Jersey had never hosted the event before, New York City has done so twelve times, most recently in 2012.

USA Today reported that organizers originally wanted to return to Madison Square Garden in Manhattan, which had hosted the American Cup in every Summer Olympics year since 2000. However, a scheduling conflict (a New York Knicks and Detroit Pistons game) forced them to relocate.

Venue

Opened on October 25, 2007, the Prudential Center is located in the central business district of Newark, New Jersey. Designed by HOK Sport, the arena is home to the National Hockey League's New Jersey Devils and two NCAA teams: the Seton Hall Pirates and NJIT Highlanders. It was also home to the Brooklyn Nets (then the New Jersey Nets), New York Liberty and the New York Titans.

The arena has held a gymnastics-related event before; it was a stop on the 2012 Kellogg's Tour of Gymnastics Champions.

Sponsors 
AT&T was the title sponsor of the event as part of a 2013–16 contract with USA Gymnastics. The company, which also provides USA Gymnastics with telecom services, became the title sponsor in 2011.

Hilton HHonors served as an additional sponsor. The company is the official hotel partner for Team USA and offers gymnastics event spectators 15% discounts at its hotels. Additionally, HHonors sponsors several male gymnasts and helps pay for training expenses and their residences at the U.S. Olympic Training Center.

Kellogg's was the final sponsor. It also worked with USA Gymnastics on the 2012 Tour of Gymnastics Champions.

Prize money 
The winners received CHF 15,000 (US$ 14,551.52), the standard prize for International Federation of Gymnastics World Cup events.

NotesExchange rate correct as of November 27, 2015.

Participants 

Sources

Qualified federations 
Invitations to the AT&T American Cup are issued based on placement at the previous year's World Championships.

Notes* denotes national federations that received a reserve qualification spot.

Reserves 
Nations that finished in places 9–12 in the team competition at the 2015 World Artistic Gymnastics Championships were allocated one reserve spot each to the Cup. The top 4 ranked individual all-around competitors whose teams did not finish in the top 12 were also given Cup bids.

Results

Women

Men

Nastia Liukin Cup 

The 7th Annual Nastia Liukin Cup was held in conjunction with the 2016 American Cup. Since its inception in 2010, the competition has always been held on the Friday night before the American Cup, in the same arena. In previous years, competitors included Gabrielle Douglas, Kayla Williams, MyKayla Skinner, Amelia Hundley, Lexie Priessman, Maggie Nichols, and Ashton Locklear.

Elite Team Cup 
On January 13, 2016, USA Gymnastics announced that the American Cup would also be held in conjunction with the Elite Team Cup, a men's competition, for the first time.

The competition took place on Saturday evening, after the American Cup.

References 

American Cup (gymnastics)
American Cup
Sports in Newark, New Jersey
American Cup
American Cup
American Cup